Abraham Jacobus le Roux is a South African rugby union player for  in the Currie Cup and in the Rugby Challenge. His usual position is hooker.

Career

He joined near-neighbours  on loan in 2013, but made the move permanent at the start of 2014. After one season in Welkom, he joined  for 2015.

References

South African rugby union players
Living people
1990 births
Blue Bulls players
Free State Cheetahs players
Golden Lions players
Rugby union players from Pretoria
Griffons (rugby union) players
Griquas (rugby union) players
Pumas (Currie Cup) players
Rugby union hookers